The 2009 Imola Superbike World Championship round was the twelfth round of the 2009 Superbike World Championship season. It took place on the weekend of September 25–27, 2009, at the Imola circuit.

Results

Superbike race 1 classification

Superbike race 2 classification

Supersport race classification

References
 Superbike Race 1
 Superbike Race 2
 Supersport Race

Imola Round
Imola